Dancing with a Dead Man is the second studio album by the Australian rock band Calling All Cars, released on 5 August 2011. It was selected as Triple J's Feature Album in that month.

At the AIR Awards of 2012, the album was nominated for Best Independent Hard Rock or Punk Album.

Track listing

Charts

Release history

References

2011 albums
Calling All Cars (band) albums
Shock Records albums
Albums produced by Tom Larkin